Lars Rudolph (born 18 August 1966) is a German actor and musician. He appeared in more than ninety films since 1984. He won the Max-Ophüls-Preis in 1997.

Partial filmography

References

External links 

1966 births
Living people
German male film actors
German male television actors
20th-century German male actors
21st-century German male actors